Chongichthys is an extinct genus of prehistoric bony fish that lived during the Oxfordian stage of the Late Jurassic epoch. Fossils of the genus have been found in the Quebrada El Profeta of Chile.

See also 

 Prehistoric fish
 List of prehistoric bony fish

References 

Elopiformes
Late Jurassic fish
Oxfordian life
Prehistoric fish of South America
Jurassic Chile
Fossils of Chile
Fossil taxa described in 1982